The 2019–20 Macedonian Second Football League was the 28th season of the Macedonian Second Football League, the second division in the Macedonian football league system. The season began on 24 August 2019 and concluded on 26 May 2020.

East

Participating teams

League table

Results

Position by round

Top scorers

West

Participating teams

League table

Results

Position by round

Top scorers

See also
2019–20 Macedonian Football Cup
2019–20 Macedonian First Football League

References

External links
Football Federation of Macedonia 
MacedonianFootball.com 

North Macedonia 2
2
Macedonian Second Football League seasons
North Macedonia